Confessions of a Tax Collector is a non-fiction memoir by author and former Internal Revenue Service (IRS) tax collector Richard Yancey.  Published in 2004 by HarperCollins, the book is a memoir of the author's twelve years employed by the IRS.  It received a positive review from Publishers Weekly, and The Wall Street Journal called it "one of the top five books ever written about taxes."

References

2004 non-fiction books
Internal Revenue Service
HarperCollins books